The 2016–17 Philadelphia 76ers season was the 68th season of the franchise in the National Basketball Association (NBA).

The team improved 18 games after finishing with a league worst 10 wins in 2016. The season would have been the rookie season for number one overall pick in the 2016 NBA draft Ben Simmons, but a broken foot injury sidelined him for the whole season. It would be the team's fourth straight season where a top prospect of theirs would be sidelined for an entire season due to an injury (the 76ers previously dealt with former center Nerlens Noel being out in the 2013–14 NBA season and Joel Embiid being out for two straight seasons before this one). However, Embiid, who was previously drafted 3rd in the 2014 draft, played in his first season after suffering multiple foot injuries before later being out for the rest of the season after playing a promising 31 games throughout the season. Also, it was the first season of draft and stash prospect Dario Šarić, who was also taken in the 2014 NBA draft. The 2016 season was also the first time in three years the Sixers made a splash in NBA free agency by adding guards Jerryd Bayless, Sergio Rodríguez and veteran Gerald Henderson Jr. to the team.

Draft picks

Offseason
During the off season the Sixers finished their Training Complex.

Game log

Preseason

|- style="background:#cfc
| 1
| October 4
| Celtics
| 
| Brandon Paul (15)
| Robert Covington (8)
| Sergio Rodriguez (6)
| Mullins Center9,493
| 1–0
|- style="background:#fcc
| 2
| October 6
| Wizards
| 
| Richaun Holmes (20)
| Richaun Holmes (12)
| T. J. McConnell (8)
| Wells Fargo Center15,440
| 1–1
|- style="background:#fcc
| 3
| October 8
| @ Cavaliers
| 
| Richaun Holmes (19)
| James Webb III (7)
| Sergio Rodriguez (8)
| Quicken Loans Arena19,694
| 1–2
|- style="background:#fcc
| 4
| October 11
| @ Grizzlies
| 
| Luwawu-Cabarrot, Embiid (13)
| Timothe Luwawu-Cabarrot (9)
| T. J. McConnell (5)
| FedExForum14,248
| 1–3
|- style="background:#fcc
| 5
| October 13
| @ Wizards
| 
| Jerami Grant (14)
| Joel Embiid (12)
| Sergio Rodriguez (7)
| Verizon Center10,242
| 1–4
|- style="background:#fcc
| 6
| October 15
| Pistons
| 
| Joel Embiid (15)
| Embiid, Holmes, Henderson (5)
| Sergio Rodriguez (7)
| Wells Fargo Center10,891
| 1–5
|- style="background:#cfc
| 7
| October 21
| @ Heat
| 
| Dario Saric (19)
| Embiid (9)
| Sergio Rodriguez (4)
| AmericanAirlines Arena19,600
| 2–5

Regular season

|- style="background:#fcc"
| 1
| October 26
| Oklahoma City
| 
| Joel Embiid (20)
| Joel Embiid (7)
| Sergio Rodriguez (9)
| Wells Fargo Center 20,487
| 0–1
|- style="background:#fcc;"
| 2
| October 29
| Atlanta
| 
| Embiid, Rodriguez (14)
| Richaun Holmes (6)
| Sergio Rodriguez (5)
| Wells Fargo Center16,312
| 0–2

|- style="background:#fcc;"
| 3
| November 1
| Orlando
| 
| Hollis Thompson (22)
| Joel Embiid (10)
| Sergio Rodriguez (11)
| Wells Fargo Center 12,529
| 0–3
|- style="background:#fcc
| 4
| November 2
| @ Charlotte
| 
| Šarić, İlyasova (14)
| Dario Šarić (7)
| Sergio Rodriguez (11)
| Spectrum Center15,275
| 0–4
|- style="background:#fcc
| 5
| November 5
| Cleveland
| 
| Joel Embiid (22)
| Robert Covington (8)
| Sergio Rodriguez (11)
| Wells Fargo Center 20,497
| 0–5
|- style="background:#fcc
| 6
| November 7
| Utah
| 
| Jahlil Okafor (15)
| Joel Embiid (9)
| Sergio Rodriguez (5)
| Wells Fargo Center14,168
| 0–6
|- style="background:#fcc
| 7
| November 9
| @ Indiana
| 
| Robert Covington (23)
| Dario Saric (12)
| Rodriguez, McConnell (5)
| Bankers Life Fieldhouse15,360
| 0–7
|- style="background:#cfc"
| 8
| November 11
| Indiana
| 
| Joel Embiid (25)
| Richaun Holmes (12)
| Sergio Rodriguez (9)
| Wells Fargo Center17,643
| 1–7
|- style="background:#fcc"
| 9
| November 12
| @ Atlanta
| 
| Jahlil Okafor (18)
| Dario Saric (7)
| T. J. McConnell (6)
| Philips Arena17,399
| 1–8
|- style="background:#fcc"
| 10
| November 14
| @ Houston
| 
| Embiid, İlyasova (13)
| Joel Embiid (10)
| Sergio Rodriguez (6)
| Toyota Center13,183
| 1–9
|- style="background:#cfc"
| 11
| November 16
| Washington
| 
| Jahlil Okafor (19)
| Dario Saric (12)
| Sergio Rodriguez (12)
| Wells Fargo Center14,863
| 2–9
|- style="background:#fcc"
| 12
| November 17
| @ Minnesota
| 
| Dario Saric (16)
| Joel Embiid (10)
| T. J. McConnell (7)
| Target Center16,866
| 2–10
|- style="background:#cfc"
| 13
| November 19
| Phoenix
| 
| Joel Embiid (26)
| Sergio Rodriguez (8)
| Sergio Rodriguez (10)
| Wells Fargo Center 18,125
| 3–10
|- style="background:#cfc"
| 14
| November 21
| Miami
| 
| Joel Embiid (22)
| Ersan Ilyasova (11)
| Sergio Rodriguez (5)
| Wells Fargo Center16,477
| 4–10
|- style="background:#fcc"
| 15
| November 23
| Memphis
| 
| Ersan Ilyasova (22)
| Ersan Ilyasova (12)
| Jerryd Bayless (6)
| Wells Fargo Center15,880
| 4–11
|- style="background:#fcc"
| 16
| November 25
| Chicago
| 
| Ersan Ilyasova (14)
| Ilyasova, Saric (7)
| Saric, Rodriguez, Stauskas (3)
| Wells Fargo Center18,234
| 4–12
|- style="background:#fcc"
| 17
| November 27
| Cleveland
| 
| Joel Embiid (22)
| Embiid, Okafor (22)
| Sergio Rodriguez (7)
| Wells Fargo Center19,311
| 4–13
|- style="background:#fcc"
| 18
| November 28
| @ Toronto
| 
| Robert Covington (20)
| Richaun Holmes (9)
| Sergio Rodriguez (9)
| Air Canada Centre 19,800
| 4–14

|- style="background:#fcc"
| 19
| December 2
| Orlando
| 
| Joel Embiid (20)
| Jahlil Okafor (13)
| Sergio Rodriguez (9)
| Wells Fargo Center13,711
| 4–15
|- style="background:#fcc"
| 20
| December 3
| Boston
| 
| Dario Saric (21)
| Dario Saric (12)
| Sergio Rodriguez (8)
| Wells Fargo Center17,063
| 4–16
|- style="background:#fcc"
| 21
| December 5
| Denver
| 
| Rodriguez, Ilyasova, Saric (17)
| Holmes, Ilyasova, Saric (8)
| Sergio Rodriguez (7)
| Wells Fargo Center11,815
| 4–17
|- style="background:#fcc"
| 22
| December 6
| @ Memphis
| 
| Ersan Ilyasova (23)
| Ersan Ilyasova (17)
| T. J. McConnell (9)
| FedEx Forum 13,521
| 4–18
|- style="background:#cfc"
| 23
| December 8
| @ New Orleans
| 
| Ersan Ilyasova (23)
| Ersan Ilyasova (8)
| Sergio Rodriguez (8)
| Smoothie King Center 14,158
| 5–18
|- style="Background:#cfc"
| 24
| December 11
| @ Detroit
| 
| Robert Covington (16)
| T. J. McConnell (10)
| T. J. McConnell (9)
| The Palace of Auburn Hills  7,244
| 6–18
|- style="background:#fcc"
| 25
| December 14
| Toronto
| 
| Robert Covington (26)
| Robert Covington (12)
| T. J. McConnell (8)
| Wells Fargo Center 16,192
| 6–19
|- style="Background:#fcc"
| 26
| December 16
| L.A. Lakers
| 
| Joel Embiid (15)
| Ersan Ilyasova (10)
| T. J. McConnell (9)
| Wells Fargo Center 20,491
| 6–20
|-style="background:#cfc"
| 27
| December 18
| Brooklyn
| 
| Joel Embiid (33)
| Jahlil Okafor (12)
| T. J. McConnell (6)
| Wells Fargo Center 16,460
| 7–20
|-style="background:#fcc"
| 28
| December 20
| New Orleans
| 
| Ersan Ilyasova (14)
| Robert Covington (8)
| T. J. McConnell (6)
| Wells Fargo Center 16,322
| 7–21
|-style="background:#fcc"
| 29
| December 23
| @ Phoenix
| 
| Joel Embiid (27)
| Joel Embiid (7)
| Sergio Rodriguez (7)
| Talking Stick Resort Arena 16,535
| 7–22
|- style="background:#fcc"
| 30
| December 26
| @ Sacramento
| 
| Joel Embiid (25)
| Dario Saric (9)
| T. J. McConnell (6)
| Golden 1 Center 17,608
| 7–23
|- style="background:#fcc"
| 31
| December 29
| @ Utah
| 
| Ersan Ilyasova (16)
| Ersan Ilyasova (12)
| Covington, Stauskas, McConnell (3)
| Vivint Smart Home Arena19,911
| 7–24
|- style="background:#cfc"
| 32
| December 30
| @ Denver
| 
| Ilyasova, Embiid (23)
| Ersan Ilyasova (12)
| T. J. McConnell (8)
| Pepsi Center13,619
| 8–24

|- style="background:#cfc"
| 33
| January 3
| Minnesota
| 
| Joel Embiid (25)
| Robert Covington (10)
| T. J. McConnell (8)
| Wells Fargo Center17,124
| 9–24
|- style="background:#fcc"
| 34
| January 6
| @ Boston
| 
| Joel Embiid (23)
| Joel Embiid (8)
| T. J. McConnell (17)
| TD Garden18,624
| 9–25
|- style="background:#cfc"
| 35
| January 8
| @ Brooklyn
| 
| Joel Embiid (20)
| Robert Covington (11)
| T. J. McConnell (6)
| Barclays Center16,123
| 10–25
|- style="background:#cfc;"
| 36
| January 11
| New York
| 
| Joel Embiid (21)
| Joel Embiid (14)
| T. J. McConnell (7)
| Wells Fargo Center18,755
| 11–25
|- style="background:#cfc;"
| 37
| January 13
| Charlotte
| 
| Joel Embiid (24)
| Joel Embiid (8)
| T. J. McConnell (8)
| Wells Fargo Center18,215
| 12–25
|- style="background:#fcc;"
| 38
| January 14
| @ Washington
| 
| Jahlil Okafor (26)
| Nerlens Noel (12)
| T. J. McConnell (6)
| Verizon Center17,880
| 12–26
|- style="background:#cfc;"
| 39
| January 16
| @ Milwaukee
| 
| Joel Embiid (22)
| Joel Embiid (12)
| Sergio Rodriguez (6)
| BMO Harris Bradley Center13,261
| 13–26
|- style="background:#cfc;"
| 40
| January 18
| Toronto
| 
| Joel Embiid (26)
| Embiid, Saric (9)
| T. J. McConnell (8)
| Wells Fargo Center17,223
| 14–26
|- style="background:#cfc;"
| 41
| January 20
| Portland
| 
| Ersan Ilyasova (24)
| Joel Embiid (10)
| Embiid, McConnell (5)
| Wells Fargo Center19,476
| 15–26
|- style="background:#fcc;"
| 42
| January 21
| @ Atlanta
| 
| Ersan Ilyasova (21)
| Robert Covington (10)
| T. J. McConnell (11)
| Philips Arena15,116
| 15–27
|- style="background:#cfc;"
| 43
| January 24
| L.A. Clippers
| 
| Nerlens Noel (19)
| Covington, Saric, Noel (8)
| T. J. McConnell (10)
| Wells Fargo Center17,591
| 16–27
|- style="background:#cfc;"
| 44
| January 25
| @ Milwaukee
| 
| Gerald Henderson Jr. (20)
| Nerlens Noel (13)
| T. J. McConnell (13)
| BMO Harris Bradley Center13,663
| 17–27
|- style="background:#fcc;"
| 45
| January 27
| Houston
| 
| Joel Embiid (32)
| Joel Embiid (7)
| T. J. McConnell (8)
| Wells Fargo Center20,588
| 17–28
|- style="background:#fcc;"
| 46
| January 29
| @ Chicago
| 
| Ersan Ilyasova (31)
| Robert Covington (12)
| T. J. McConnell (12)
| United Center21,606
| 17–29
|- style="background:#cfc;"
| 47
| January 30
| Sacramento
| 
| Robert Covington (23)
| Robert Covington (10)
| T. J. McConnell (11)
| Wells Fargo Center15,840
| 18–29

|- style="background:#fcc;"
| 48
| February 1
| @ Dallas
| 
| Jahlil Okafor (16)
| Ersan Ilyasova (10)
| Rodriguez, McConnell (4)
| American Airlines Center19,263
| 18–30
|- style="background:#fcc;"
| 49
| February 2
| @ San Antonio
| 
| Ersan Ilyasova (25)
| Ersan Ilyasova (10)
| T. J. McConnell (7)
| AT&T Center18,418
| 18–31
|- style="background:#fcc;"
| 50
| February 4
| @ Miami
| 
| Ersan Ilyasova (21)
| Noel, Holmes (7)
| Nik Stauskas (6)
| American Airlines Arena19,754
| 18–32
|- style="background:#fcc;"
| 51
| February 6
| @ Detroit
| 
| Jahlil Okafor (16)
| T. J. McConnell (7)
| Dario Saric (4)
| The Palace of Auburn Hills14,731
| 18–33
|- style="background:#fcc;"
| 52
| February 8
| San Antonio
| 
| Okafor, Saric (20)
| Jahlil Okafor (8)
| Nik Stauskas (7)
| Wells Fargo Center19,233
| 18–34
|- style="background:#cfc;"
| 53
| February 9
| @ Orlando
| 
| Dario Saric (24)
| Robert Covington (9)
| T. J. McConnell (8)
| Amway Center17,829
| 19–34
|- style="background:#cfc;"
| 54
| February 11
| Miami
| 
| Noel, Covington (19)
| Robert Covington (7)
| T. J. McConnell (10)
| Wells Fargo Center 20,698
| 20–34
|- style="background:#cfc;"
| 55
| February 13
| @ Charlotte
| 
| Dario Saric (18)
| Dario Saric (11)
| T. J. McConnell (7)
| Spectrum Center15,775
| 21–34
|- style="background:#fcc;"
| 56
| February 15
| @ Boston
| 
| Dario Saric (20)
| Dario Saric (11)
| T. J. McConnell (8)
| TD Garden18,624
| 21–35
|- style="background:#cfc;"
| 57
| February 24
| Washington
| 
| Robert Covington (25)
| Robert Covington (11)
| Rodriguez, McConnell (8)
| Wells Fargo Center 19,277
| 22–35
|- style="background:#fcc;"
| 58
| February 25
| @ New York
| 
| Jahlil Okafor (28)
| Dario Saric (15)
| T. J. McConnell (7)
| Madison Square Garden19,812
| 22–36
|- style="background:#fcc;"
| 59
| February 27
| Golden State
| 
| Dario Saric (21)
| Robert Covington (8)
| Dario Saric (7)
| Wells Fargo Center 20,585
| 22–37

|- style="background:#fcc;"
| 60
| March 1
| @ Miami
| 
| Robert Covington (19)
| Jahlil Okafor (7)
| T. J. McConnell (5)
| AmericanAirlines Arena19,609
| 22–38
|- style="background:#cfc;"
| 61
| March 3
| New York
| 
| Dario Saric (21)
| Dario Saric (10)
| Saric, McConnell  (4)
| Wells Fargo Center 18,518
| 23–38
|- style="background:#fcc;"
| 62
| March 4
| Detroit
| 
| Nik Stauskas (24)
| Justin Anderson (8)
| T. J. McConnell (8)
| Wells Fargo Center19,523
| 23–39
|- style="background:#fcc;"
| 63
| March 6
| Milwaukee
| 
| Justin Anderson (19)
| Richaun Holmes (9)
| Rodriguez, McConnell (8)
| Wells Fargo Center18,351
| 23–40
|- style="background:#fcc;"
| 64
| March 9
| @ Portland
| 
| Dario Saric (28)
| Robert Covington (19)
| Rodriguez, McConnell (6)
| Moda Center19,240
| 23–41
|- style=background:#fcc;"
| 65
| March 11
| @ L.A. Clippers
| 
| Richaun Holmes (24)
| Richaun Holmes (9)
| T. J. McConnell (10)
| Staples Center19,060
| 23–42
|- style=background:#cfc;"
| 66
| March 12
| @ L.A. Lakers
| 
| Dario Saric (29)
| Dario Saric (7)
| T. J. McConnell (8)
| Staples Center18,997
| 24–42
|- style="background:#fcc;"
| 67
| March 14
| @ Golden State
| 
| Dario Saric (25)
| Robert Covington (9)
| T. J. McConnell (10)
| Oracle Arena19,596
| 24–43
|- style="background:#cfc;"
| 68
| March 17
| Dallas
| 
| Justin Anderson (19)
| Robert Covington (9)
| Rodriguez, McConnell (6)
| Wells Fargo Center17,642
| 25–43
|- style="background:#cfc;"
| 69
| March 19
| Boston
| 
| Dario Saric (23)
| Robert Covington (9)
| Rodriguez, McConnell (6)
| Wells Fargo Center19,446
| 26–43
|- style="background:#fcc;"
| 70
| March 20
| @ Orlando
| 
| Covington, Holmes (24)
| Richaun Holmes (14)
| T. J. McConnell (11)
| Amway Center16,236
| 26–44
|- style="background:#fcc;"
| 71
| March 22
| @ Oklahoma City
| 
| Nik Stauskas (20)
| Shawn Long (6)
| Rodriguez, McConnell (4)
| Chesapeake Energy Arena18,203
| 26–45
|- style="background:#cfc;"
| 72
| March 24
| @ Chicago
| 
| Dario Saric (32)
| Dario Saric (10)
| T. J. McConnell (8)
| United Center21,558
| 27–45
|- style="background:#fcc;"
| 73
| March 26
| @ Indiana
| 
| Sergio Rodriguez (16)
| Richaun Holmes (12)
| T. J. McConnell (7)
| Bankers Life Fieldhouse16,467
| 27–46
|- style="background:#cfc;"
| 74
| March 28
| @ Brooklyn
| 
| Dario Saric (23)
| Robert Covington (13)
| T. J. McConnell (10)
| Barclays Center15,471
| 28–46
|- style="background:#fcc;"
| 75
| March 29
| Atlanta
| 
| Richaun Holmes (25)
| Timothe Luwawu-Cabarrot (10)
| T. J. McConnell (8)
| Wells Fargo Center15,212
| 28–47
|- style= "background:#fcc;"
| 76
| March 31
| @ Cleveland
| 
| Luwawu-Cabarrot, Holmes (19)
| Justin Anderson (10)
| T. J. McConnell (7)
| Quicken Loans Arena 20,562
| 28–48

|- style="background:#fcc;"
| 77
| April 2
| @ Toronto
| 
| Timothe Luwawu-Cabarrot (23)
| Richaun Holmes (7)
| T. J. McConnell (11)
| Air Canada Centre19,800
| 28–49
|- style="background:#fcc;"
| 78
| April 4
| Brooklyn
| 
| Timothe Luwawu-Cabarrot (19)
| Alex Poythress (7)
| T. J. McConnell (7)
| Wells Fargo Center14,580
| 28–50
|- style="background:#fcc;"
| 79
| April 6
| Chicago
| 
| Timothe Luwawu-Cabarrot (18)
| Holmes, Saric (10)
| T. J. McConnell (8)
| Wells Fargo Center15,177
| 28–51
|- style="background:#fcc;"
| 80
| April 8
| Milwaukee
| 
| Richaun Holmes (17)
| Richaun Holmes (10)
| T. J. McConnell (10)
| Wells Fargo Center16,301
| 28–52
|- style="background:#fcc;"
| 81
| April 10
| Indiana
| 
| Timothe Luwawu-Cabarrot (24)
| Holmes, Saric (6)
| T. J. McConnell (8)
| Wells Fargo Center14,622
| 28–53
|- style="background:#fcc;"
| 82
| April 12
| @ New York
| 
| Justin Anderson (26)
| Shawn Long (9)
| T. J. McConnell (8)
| Madison Square Garden19,812
| 28–54

Standings

Division

Conference

Roster

Roster Notes
 Small forward Robert Covington played 67 games but was ruled out for the rest of the season on March 31, 2017, due to a right knee injury.
 Center Joel Embiid played 31 games but missed the rest of the season due to a left knee injury.
 Center Jahlil Okafor played 50 games but missed the rest of the season due to a right knee injury.
 Point guard Sergio Rodríguez played 68 games but missed the last 3 remaining games of the season after suffering a left hamstring strain.
 Point guard Ben Simmons missed the entire season due to a right foot injury.

Awards, records and milestones

Awards

Records
 Joel Embiid set second most consecutive 20+ point games by a rookie with 10 (Allen Iverson had 11)

Announcers

National TV
For the last three seasons the Sixers had not had a nationally televised game. The last being in February 2013 when a game vs the Chicago Bulls was broadcast on ESPN.

During the 2016-17 campaign the 76ers have three nationally televised games, with the home and season opener on October 26 against the OKC Thunder and December 16 vs the LA Lakers on ESPN. And a November 17 matchup with the Minnesota Timberwolves on TNT.

Uniforms
On September 15 the Sixers announced they will wear special uniforms for Saturday games to honor the 1966-67 Philadelphia 76ers Championship team. The jerseys have a "throwback" style with PHILA on the chest of the jersey and on the shorts there is an insignia of the Liberty Bell with the 76ers logo established in the center with the words "World Championships; 1966 1967".

Transactions

Trades

Free agents

Additions

Subtractions

References

Philadelphia 76ers seasons
Philadelphia 76ers
Philadelphia 76ers
Philadelphia 76ers